Mordellistena lepidula is a beetle in the genus Mordellistena of the family Mordellidae. It was described in 1862 by John Lawrence LeConte.

References

lepidula
Beetles described in 1862